R#J is a 2021 American experimental romantic drama film written by Rickie Castaneda, Oleksii Sobolev and Carey Williams, who is also the director. The film stars David Zayas, María Gabriela de Faría, Diego Tinoco and RJ Cyler. The film is a modern-day adaptation of Shakespeare's romantic tragedy Romeo and Juliet, told through text messages, photos and videos on mobile phones and social media posts.

The film had its world premiere at the 2021 Sundance Film Festival on January 30, 2021.

Cast
 David Zayas as Fernando 
 María Gabriela de Faría as Nancy
 Diego Tinoco as Tybalt
 RJ Cyler as Benvo
 Moe Irvin as Alcide Montague
 Jacob Ming-Trent as Friar Lawrence
 Emilio Garcia-Sanchez as Sampson
 Camaron Engels as Romeo
 Siddiq Saunderson as Mercutio
 Ricky Russert as Gregory
 Francesca Noel as Juliet
 DeShawn Cavanaugh as Abram
 Matias Ponce as Young Fernando

Release
The film had its premiere in the 2021 Sundance Film Festival on January 30, 2021 in the Next section. It also screened at South by Southwest in March 2021, where it won the Adobe Editing Award.

Reception
R#J received mixed reviews from critics. The review aggregator website Rotten Tomatoes surveyed  and, categorizing the reviews as positive or negative, assessed 14 as positive and 13 as negative for a 52% rating. Among the reviews, it determined an average rating of 6.4 out of 10. The critics consensus reads: "R#J represents an admirable attempt to update Romeo and Juliet, but alas, its bounty is not quite as boundless as the sea."

References

External links
 
 

American romantic drama films
American independent films
American avant-garde and experimental films
2021 romantic drama films
2021 independent films
Films based on Romeo and Juliet
Modern adaptations of works by William Shakespeare
Films about mobile phones
Films about social media
2020s avant-garde and experimental films
2020s English-language films
Screenlife films
2020s American films